Atangana is a surname. Notable people with the surname include:
 Charles Atangana (circa 1880-1943), Cameroonian traditional ruler
 Marie-Thérèse Catherine Atangana Assiga Ahanda, (c. 1941-2014), Cameroonian novelist and chemist
 Jean-Marie Atangana Mebara (born 1954), Cameroonian politician
 Michel Thierry Atangana (born 1964), French citizen of Cameroonian origin
 Mvondo Atangana (born 1979), Cameroonian footballer